Charles VI may refer to:

 Charles VI of France (1368–1422), "the Well-Beloved" and "The Mad King"
 Charles VI, Holy Roman Emperor (1685–1740), and VI of Naples
 Infante Carlos, Count of Montemolin (1818–1861), pretender to the throne of Spain, styled "Charles VI" by Carlists
 Charles VI, Prince of Löwenstein-Wertheim-Rosenberg (1834–1921)
 Charles VI (opera), an 1843 opera by Fromental Halévy

See also
 King Charles (disambiguation)
 Charles